Pelli  is a 1997 Indian Telugu-language film directed by Kodi Ramakrishna. The film stars Vadde Naveen, Maheswari and Pruthvi. The film was commercially successful and won one Filmfare Award and two Nandi Awards. It was a remake of Sleeping With the Enemy and later was remade in Tamil as Aval Varuvala (1998) as well as in Kannada as Maduve (2000) and in Hindi as Koi Mere Dil Se Poochhe (2002).

Plot
Naveen, a UTI Bank manager sees Maheswari, a sales girl in a shopping mall and promptly falls in love and wants to marry her. Soon he goes on a mission in search of her, only to find her in a colony living with Janakamma, who he believes is her mother. Naveen with the help of the colony members tries to win her love. Knowing of his intention, Janakamma tries to convince Maheswari to marry Naveen to which Maheswari refuses. In fact, Janakamma is the mother-in-law of Maheswari to whom she marries off her only son Pruthvi. After an enduring physically and emotionally abusive marriage, finally on one day, Mahewsari fatally wounds Pruthvi, knocking him unconscious. Both Janakamma and Maheswari flee from the scene and start a fresh life as mother and daughter thinking that he is dead. However, Maheswari falls in love with Naveen and agrees to marry him.

Prithvi somehow finds them and shows up at the engagement party and blackmails Maheswari to get his ten lakh loan sanctioned by Naveen, or else he would tell everyone the truth that they are still married. Meanwhile, Janakamma is convinced that the only way of stopping her son from ruining Naveen and Maheswari's wedding is to kill him. The wedding and Pruthvi's birthday fall on the same day. Janakamma makes payasam for Pruthvi as she always does on his birthday and puts poison in it. Prithvi being suspicious of her mother being here instead of at the wedding, asks her to drink the payasam first to which she obliges. He then drinks it and dies, later Janakamma makes it in time for the wedding and dies just after the ceremony.

Cast

Production 
Pelli is loosely based on the 1991 American film Sleeping With the Enemy !(1991).

Music

Reception 
The film was reviewed by Zamin Ryot. A critic from Andhra Today said that "The movie, a good entertainer until the arrival of Prithvi on the scene takes on a serious turn. The director Kodi Ramakrishna proves an expert in combining humor and sentiment".

Awards
Filmfare Awards
 Best Male Playback Singer – Telugu - Mano - "Rukku Rukku Rukmini"

Nandi Awards
 Best Character Actress - Sujatha
 Best Villain - Prithviraj

Remakes
The film was remade in Kannada as Maduve (1998), in Tamil as Aval Varuvala (1998) and in Hindi as Koi Mere Dil Se Poochhe (2002).

References

External links
 

1990s Telugu-language films
1997 films
Telugu films remade in other languages
Indian romantic drama films
Films about domestic violence
Films directed by Kodi Ramakrishna
Films set in Hyderabad, India
Films shot in Hyderabad, India
1997 romantic drama films